Raelee Hill (born 24 October 1972) is an Australian actress best known for portraying roles in some of Australia's most successful television series. Her first major role was as Loretta Taylor in Paradise Beach, which was followed shortly afterwards by roles as Serendipity Gottlieb in Neighbours and Constable Tayler Johnson in Water Rats.

She is most widely known internationally for her part as Sikozu in the sci-fi television series Farscape. She originally auditioned for the part of Mele-On Grayza, but the part ultimately went to Rebecca Riggs. The role of Sikozu was created especially for her by executive producer David Kemper at the time, because she had impressed them so much.

She made her film début in the 1996 romantic comedy Hotel de Love, and her theatre credits include the role of Wendy in Pan for The Jim Henson Company, as well as Tasting Sugar Lake for Budinskis Theatre. She played a role in the 2005 Indonesian film about the 2002 Bali bombing, Long Road to Heaven.

Filmography

Film

Television

References

External links

1972 births
Australian television actresses
Living people
Australian film actresses
Actresses from Brisbane